Donji Podpeć is a village in the municipality of Srebrenik, Bosnia and Herzegovina.

Demographics 
According to the 2013 census, its population was 703.

References

Populated places in Srebrenik